Raik Dittrich (born 12 October 1968 in Sebnitz) is a retired East German biathlete who won two World Championships medals. He represented the sports club SG Dynamo Zinnwald / Sportvereinigung (SV) Dynamo.

References

1968 births
Living people
German male biathletes
Biathlon World Championships medalists
People from Sebnitz
Sportspeople from Saxony